The 1953 German football championship was the culmination of the football season in the West Germany in 1952–53. 1. FC Kaiserslautern were crowned champions for the second time after a group stage and a final, having previously won the championship in 1951.

Qualified teams
The teams qualified through the 1952–53 Oberliga season:

Competition

Group 1

Group 2

Final

References

External links
 1952-53 at Weltfussball.de
 Germany - Championship 1953 at RSSSF.com
 German championship 1953 at Fussballdaten.de

West
German football championship seasons